Thornford railway station serves the village of Thornford, in Dorset, England.

History
The station was opened by the Great Western Railway on 23 March 1936 as Thornford Bridge Halt. It was renamed in the 1960s.

Facilities 
Thornford only has the most basic facilities, being a small waiting area, a help point, bike racks and some information boards including timetable posters.

Services
South Western Railway runs additional services on Summer Saturdays between Weymouth and Yeovil Junction operating from late May to early September. This is a request stop so passengers must signal clearly to the driver if they wish to board the train.

References

Railway stations in Dorset
Former Great Western Railway stations
Railway stations in Great Britain opened in 1936
Railway stations served by Great Western Railway
Railway request stops in Great Britain
DfT Category F2 stations